This article contains information about the literary events and publications of 1798.

Events

February – Samuel Taylor Coleridge writes the conversation poem "Frost at Midnight", commonly seen as the best of the series.
April – Coleridge writes the conversation poems "Fears in Solitude" ("Written ... During the Alarm of an Invasion", soon published in a pamphlet) and "The Nightingale".
April 16 – Coleridge's "The Recantation: An Ode" appears in The Morning Post, describing his disillusionment with the French Revolution.
April 30 – Richard Cumberland's comedy The Eccentric Lover is first performed at the Covent Garden Theatre in London.
September 18 – Lyrical Ballads, with a Few Other Poems by William Wordsworth and Samuel Taylor Coleridge is first published anonymously in Bristol by Joseph Cottle (who also remains anonymous), marking the beginning of English literary Romanticism. Most of the poems are by Wordsworth, including Lines composed a few miles above Tintern Abbey on revisiting the banks of the Wye during a tour, 13 July 1798, but also opening with the first publication of Coleridge's The Rime of the Ancyent Marinere, whose first London publication is on October 4.
October 11 – Elizabeth Inchbald's Lovers' Vows (adapted from Kotzebue's Das Kind der Liebe – the child of love) is first performed at the Theatre Royal, Drury Lane, London.
October 12 – The rebuilt Weimarer Hoftheater are inaugurated with the first performance of the first part of Friedrich Schiller's dramatic trilogy Wallenstein: Das Lager (The Camp), directed by Goethe.
unknown dates
Ivan Kotliarevsky's mock-heroic poem Eneyida (Енеїда) becomes the first printed work in the modern Ukrainian language.
The National Library of the Netherlands originates when the Batavian Republic opens the former library of the stadtholder to the public.
The Académie française publishes the 5th edition of its Dictionnaire.
Thomas Nelson's publishing company is established in Edinburgh as a second-hand religious bookshop.

New books

Fiction
Charles Brockden Brown
Alcuin: a Dialogue
Wieland: or, The Transformation; an American Tale
Emily Clark – Ianthé, or the Flower of Caernarvon
Francis Lathom – The Midnight Bell: a German story, founded on incidents in real life
Regina Maria Roche – Clermont: a Tale
Eleanor Sleath – The Orphan of the Rhine: a romance
Caroline von Wolzogen (anonymously) – Agnes von Lilien (first complete book publication, in 2 vols)
Mary Wollstonecraft – Posthumous Works (edited by William Godwin) including Maria: or, The Wrongs of Woman

Children
François Guillaume Ducray-Duminil – Cœlina, ou l'Enfant du mystère (Celina, or the Mystery Child)
Edward Augustus Kendall
Keeper's Travels in Search of His Master
The Sparrow. A Tale
Richmal Mangnall (anonymously) – Historical and Miscellaneous Questions for the Use of Young People (often known as Mangnall's Questions)
Samuel Jackson Pratt – Pity's Gift: a collection of interesting tales, to excite the compassion of youth for the animal creation (Selected by a Lady)

Drama
Elizabeth Craven – The Georgian Princess
Richard Cumberland – 
 The Eccentric Lover
 A Word for Nature
Thomas Holcroft – 
He's Much to Blame
 Knave or Not?
Elizabeth Inchbald – Lovers' Vows
 Thomas Morton 
 Secrets Worth Knowing
 Speed the Plough
Friedrich von Schiller – Wallensteins Lager

Poetry

Samuel Taylor Coleridge and William Wordsworth – Lyrical Ballads
Richard Polwhele (anonymously) – The Unsex'd Females
The Rime of the Ancient Mariner

Non-fiction
Nathan Drake – Literary Hours
Hannah Webster Foster – The Boarding School; or, Lessons of a Preceptress to Her Pupils
William Godwin – Memoirs of the Author of A Vindication of the Rights of Woman
Edward Jenner – An Inquiry Into the Causes and Effects of the Variolæ Vaccinæ
Thomas Malthus (anonymously) – An Essay on the Principle of Population
Richmal Mangnall – Historical and Miscellaneous Questions for the Use of Young People

Births
January 5 – David Macbeth Moir, Scottish poet and humorist (died 1851)
January 29 – Henry Neele, English poet and scholar (died 1828)
February 12 – Catherine Gore, English novelist and dramatist (died 1861)
February 17 – Auguste Comte, French philosopher (died 1857)
March 30 – Luise Hensel, German religious author and poet (died 1876)
June 29 – Count Giacomo Leopardi, Italian poet, essayist and philologist (died 1837)

Deaths
April 12 – Madeleine de Puisieux, French philosopher and feminist writer (born 1720)
June 4 – Giacomo Casanova, Italian librarian and memoirist (born 1725)
June 20 – Jeremy Belknap, American historian of New Hampshire (born 1744)
December 16 – Thomas Pennant, Welsh naturalist and travel writer (born 1726)

References

 
Years of the 18th century in literature